Apollo Up! is an American post-punk/pop punk/indie band based in Nashville, Tennessee. Billboard described the band as post-hardcore. Their sound has been compared to Ted Leo and the Pharmacists, and Fugazi.

Singer/guitarist Jay Leo Phillips, bassist Mike Shepherd, and drummer Jereme Frey, each former or ongoing members of local bands Lotushalo, Shiboleth, On Command, and Forget Cassettes, formed the band in late 2002. Their debut album, Light the End and Burn It Through, was released by indie label Theory 8 Records in January 2004.

Phillips divided his activities between Apollo Up! and dream pop trio Forget Cassettes, touring with both bands and working on the latter's second album, Salt, before concentrating on Apollo's second release, Chariots of Fire in June 2006. The group continued to gig locally and toured, playing, among other venues, at Cincinnati's Desdemona Festival in 2006. The band released a 5-song EP, Walking Papers, in 2008.

References

External links
Official website
Page at Theory 8 Records

American post-hardcore musical groups
Punk rock groups from Tennessee
Indie rock musical groups from Tennessee
Musical groups established in 2002
Musical groups from Nashville, Tennessee
American musical trios
2002 establishments in Tennessee